The Black Death (Peste negra) was present in the states of present-day Spain between 1348 and 1350. In the 14th-century, present-day Spain was composed of the Kingdoms of Aragon, Castile and Navarre, and the Emirate of Granada. In the countries on the Iberian Peninsula, the Black Death is well documented and researched in Navarre and particularly in Aragon (recorded in the chronicle of Peter IV), but less documented in Castile, Portugal and Granada.

In the Iberian Peninsula the Black Death is estimated to have killed 60 to 65% of the population, reducing its total population from six million to 2 to 2.5 million. In absolute terms, Europe's 80 million inhabitants were reduced to only 30 million between 1347 and 1353.

Aragon

The Black Death in Aragon is described by contemporary witnesses, such as in the chronicle of Peter IV of Aragon, and has been subjected to thorough research which has demonstrated the effect the plague could have on a society. The bubonic plague pandemic known as the Black Death reached Aragon in the spring of 1348, and lasted a year.   It interrupted the civil war which took place at the time, when the king was able to convince the rebels by whom he was captive to release him as they would otherwise endanger his life because of the migration of the plague. The collapse of the administration and social order lasted for several years and resulted a break down of law an order, widespread criminality, repression from the nobility and rebellions during the following century.

Castile

The Black Death in Castile are not as well researched or documented as in Aragon and Navarre. In 1350, it caused the death of king Alfonso XI of Castile in the middle of his warfare against Muslim Andalusia.

In 1435, in response to an outbreak of the plague, the village of Madrid shut its gates. King John II of Castile was receiving ambassadors from the King of France at the time, and while the King fled to Illescas in Toledo for his safety, the ambassadors were led to an area outside the Madrid walls; that area is now known as Embajadores.

Navarre

The Black Death in Navarre has been subjected to the research of Maurice Berthe, among others. It had a severe effect on the country, as Navarre was already recovering from a severe famine when the Plague arrived. About 50 percent of the population are estimated to have died.

References

14th-century health disasters
14th century in Spain
Spain
Death in Spain
Health disasters in Spain
1348 in Europe
1349 in Europe
1350 in Europe